Yashwant Manohar (born 26 March 1943) is an Indian Marathi-language poet, writer, and a literary critic. He gained fame with his first poetry collection Utthangumpha (उत्थानगुंफा) published in 1977.  His poetry speaks fiercely against caste oppression and advocates equality, liberty, and fraternity. The poetry of Manohar is deeply influenced by the life and works of Dr. B. R. Ambedkar. Manohar is a Buddhist.

References

External links 
Yashwant Manohar - Homepage dedicated to life and works of Dr. Yashwant Manohar.

1943 births
Living people
Dr. Babasaheb Ambedkar Marathwada University alumni
Savitribai Phule Pune University alumni
Indian Buddhists
20th-century Buddhists
21st-century Buddhists
Writers from Nagpur
Marathi-language poets
Dalit writers